The Nokia 1208 is a low-end GSM mobile phone sold by the Finnish company Nokia under their Ultrabasic series. The phone was announced in May 2007. It is very similar to Nokia 1200, the difference being the color display. The phone sold 100 million units, making it one of the most successful phones to date, along with Nokia 1200, which sold 150 million units.

Features
The Nokia 1208 has a CSTN display with 65,000 colours, and is 29 x 23 millimeters (1.5 inches). The resolution is 96 x 68 pixels. It had two models: the colour display and the LCD model.
The Nokia 1208 has interchangeable body-plates

References

1208